Weejasperaspis is an extinct acanthothoracid placoderm found in the Taemas-Weejasper Reef, of the Early Devonian-aged Buchan Group in eastern Victoria, Australia and the type species is W. gavini. Weejasperaspis differs from other acanthothoracids in that the median dorsal crest is short, and triangular-shaped. Its sister genus, Murrindalaspis, differs from it by having large, blade-like median dorsal crests that are recurved.  Like Murrindalaspis, it is only known from a dorsal plate and ossified eyeballs.

References 

Placoderm genera
Acanthothoracids
Placoderms of Australia
Fossil taxa described in 1978